Brian Moore may refer to:

Sportspeople
 Brian Moore (footballer, born 1933) (1933–2006), association football player from Northern Ireland
 Brian Moore (footballer, born 1938), English footballer
 Brian Moore (soccer), retired American soccer midfielder
 Brian Moore (rugby league) (1944–2014), Australian rugby league footballer and coach
 Brian Moore (rugby union) (born 1962), English rugby union footballer and commentator

Politicians
 Brian Moore (political activist) (born 1943), Socialist Party USA and Liberty Union Party nominee for president
 Brian Moore (Iowa politician) (born 1962), member of the Iowa House of Representatives

Others

 Brian Moore (novelist) (1921–1999), Northern Irish novelist and screenwriter
Brian Moore (commentator) (1932–2001), British sports commentator and television presenter
 Brian Moore (scientist) (born 1946), professor of auditory perception
 Brian Moore (police officer) (born 1959), former of the UK Border Force, former Chief Constable of Wiltshire Police, England
 Brian Moore, American police officer who was shot in 2015; see shooting of Brian Moore

See also
 Bryan Moore (disambiguation)